Maurice Crum Jr. (born May 29, 1986) is a former American football player and was formerly the co-defensive coordinator and linebackers coach at the University of Mississippi.  Crum was formerly the defensive coordinator and linebackers coach at Western Kentucky University. He played for the Sacramento Mountain Lions of the United Football League. He was signed by the Redwoods as an undrafted free agent in 2009. He played college football at Notre Dame where he was a starting linebacker and team captain.

Crum was previously on staff at the University of Kansas under head coach Charlie Weis from 2012-2014. He was on the staff at the University of Notre Dame under head coach Brian Kelly, as a defensive graduate assistant for the 2015 season. Crum served as a secondary coach in 2016 at Indiana State University.

Personal life
He is married to Crysta Swayzer Crum, and has three sons, Maurice III, Allen and Noah.

References

External links

 Just Sports Stats
 Notre Dame profile

1986 births
Living people
American football linebackers
Indiana State Sycamores football coaches
Notre Dame Fighting Irish football coaches
Notre Dame Fighting Irish football players
Ole Miss Rebels football coaches
Kansas Jayhawks football coaches
Sacramento Mountain Lions players
SMU Mustangs football coaches
Western Kentucky Hilltoppers football coaches
People from Riverview, Hillsborough County, Florida
Coaches of American football from Florida
Players of American football from Florida